Peace Hyde is a British-Ghanaian television producer, TV host, creator, journalist and education activist. She is the creator and executive producer of Netflix's first African reality TV series Young, Famous & African, as well as the Head of digital media and partnership and the West African Correspondent at Forbes Africa. She is the founder of Aim Higher Africa, a non-profit organization focused on improving the quality of education in impoverished communities across Africa. In 2018, she was shortlisted among 200 leaders as part of the Obama Foundation Africa Leaders program and in 2019, was awarded the African Social Impact Award at the House of Parliament, House of Commons in the UK.

Early life and education 
Hyde was born and raised in London, where she lived until 2015, before she relocated to Ghana. During her early years in London, she briefly practiced as a child psychologist before embarking on a career as a science teacher specializing in physics, chemistry and biology.

Hyde is an alumnus of Middlesex University, where she graduated with a psychology degree.

Career 
Hyde is the head of Digital Media and partnership as well as the West African Correspondent at Forbes Africa. She is responsible for the editorial content from the West African region as well as driving revenue growth for the brands through partnerships.

She is also an education activist, working on providing education and entrepreneurship development for impoverished and unemployed youths. Her work with her charity Aim Higher Africa led to Hyde being shortlisted by Barack Obama as an Obama Foundation Leaders Africa fellow. In 2019, Hyde was also awarded the Africa Social Impact Award at the UK House of Parliament for her work with the charity.

Hyde work as a journalist has appeared in Black Enterprise, Huffington Post, Ebony and Fox News. She was included in the United Nations' Most Influential People of African Descent list for 2017 and 2018. Hyde is a judge for the CNBC All Africa Business Leaders Awards, The Chivas Venture Fund and the Veuve Clicquot Business Woman Award.

Education activism 
Hyde is the founder of education not for profit Aim Higher Africa with a focus on building the next generation of entrepreneurs and change makers in Africa by educating, inspiring and empowering a generation of young leaders. The organization has been engaging and providing quality education for entrepreneurs across the continent to learn and develop by offering connections to like-minded peers, access to investors, mentorship and financial literacy workshops. Since its inception, the organization has created over 6000 small businesses in West Africa and reaching some 3 million plus students.

In 2018, Hyde launched her skills acquisition centre in Yaba to provide free education and also provide skills training for start-ups in Nigeria to develop entrepreneurship skills through her Mind-set Reorientation and Design Thinking (MRDT) curriculum.

Media entrepreneurship 
Peace is the creator and executive producer of the first ever African reality TV series on Netflix, Young, Famous & African. She is the creator, producer as well as the host of two talk shows, Forbes Africa’s My Worst Day with Peace Hyde (3 seasons), where she speaks to Africa’s billionaires and Forbes Woman Africa’s Against the Odds (2 seasons) on the CNBC Africa channel on DSTV. She is the producer of the Vice News documentary Inside Nigeria’s push to end police brutality. The documentary is a winner of the Top Shorts film festival award, Los Angeles Film Festival, Lonely Wolf Film Festival and the IMDB Special Award. She also hosted her own talk show, Friday Night Live, which ran for 4 seasons as well as the music talent competition in Ghana, MTN Hitmaker, for 3 seasons. Named by CNN as Ghana’s most successful media maven, Hyde’s work has been featured on CNN, Black Enterprise, Huffington Post, Ebony, Fox News, and Essence. She was named to the United Nations Most Influential People of African Descent list for 2017 and 2018 and named as one of the 100 most influential young people in Africa. In 2018, Peace was shortlisted by President Barack Obama from a pool of 30,000 African leaders to be part of the 200 Inaugural Obama Foundation Africa Leaders.

Public Speaking 
Peace Hyde speaks on the power of mindsets, fulfilling of life purpose, entrepreneurship development and education, as well as Gender Equality and Women empowerment issues. Hyde was the keynote speaker for the Flourish Africa Conference, a platform created by Africa's richest woman, Folorunso Alakija. She was a speaker at TEDX Accra, TEDX Kumasi, Global Social Awards in Prague, Essence, Africa 2018 Forum in Egypt, Social Media Week Lagos, and Hustle in Heels London.

Awards and recognition

References

External links 
 
 

Living people
British television presenters
British women television presenters
Alumni of Middlesex University
Ghanaian television presenters
Ghanaian women television presenters
Year of birth missing (living people)